WOTR (96.3 FM) is a Southern Gospel and Positive Country broadcast radio station licensed to Weston, West Virginia, United States, and serves the Clarksburg/Weston area.  WOTR is owned and operated by Della Jane Woofter.

Sale
On February 13, 2009, Harry Allman (Administrator) (under the company name Allman Electronics Lab) sold WOTR for $75,000 to Stephen Peters, owner of nearby WHAW.  The reason for the sale was the death of owner James Allman.  During this period, the station was silent.

On May 15, 2009, WOTR relaunched with programming from the Inspirational Country Radio Network, carrying a Southern Gospel and Positive Country format mixed with Bluegrass.  WOTR is the network's first affiliate.

References

External links
 WOTR Online
 

Southern Gospel radio stations in the United States
Country radio stations in the United States
Radio stations established in 1991
OTR